Jeffrey de Zwaan (born 26 March 1996) is a Dutch professional darts player who plays in events of the Professional Darts Corporation (PDC).

Career
De Zwaan progressed through to the last 16 of the 2014 World Masters, where he lost 3–0 to Glen Durrant. He won a two-year PDC Tour Card in 2015 by defeating Prakash Jiwa 5–1 in the final round. He played in the German Darts Championship and saw off Devon Petersen 6–2, before being whitewashed 6–0 by Adrian Lewis in round two. A last 16 showing in the final qualifier saw de Zwaan make his debut at the UK Open and he lost 5–2 to Benito van de Pas in the second round. He eliminated Steve Brown, Michael Smith, Ken MacNeil and Jelle Klaasen to reach his first PDC quarter-final at the fourth Players Championship event and lost 6–3 to Lewis. De Zwaan got the final European spot for the European Championship and lost 6–3 to world number one Michael van Gerwen in the opening round.

De Zwaan's first year on the PDC tour saw him finish high enough on the Pro Tour Order of Merit to qualify for the 2016 World Championship and his first round match with Michael Smith went to a sudden-death leg. Smith won the bull to throw first and de Zwaan could only kick off with a 29 and was beaten 4–3. He lost 6–5 in the second round of the UK Open to Alex Roy. He reached the last 32 of four Players Championships and qualified for two European Tour events, but was knocked out in the first round of both. De Zwaan contested the final of the 18th Development Tour event and was beaten 4–2 by Corey Cadby.

In the 2018 UK Open, he drew number one seed Michael van Gerwen and won the match 10–8, ultimately ending the World Number 1's unbeaten run on an ITV Major Tournament since November 2014. Jeffrey lost 10–8 in the following round to Rileys qualifier Paul Hogan.

In April, de Zwaan made a significant step up by winning his first PDC ranking title by beating Jonny Clayton 6–5.

In the 2018 World Matchplay, he drew Michael van Gerwen in the first round and beat him again 10–6 meaning he had beat him in a major event twice in one year which was considered a huge upset due to Michael van Gerwen being the current world number 1 and Jeffrey ranking in at world number 68.

Following Gary Anderson's withdrawal from the 2019 Premier League, de Zwaan was selected as one of nine 'contenders' to replace him. He would play a one-off match against Rob Cross on night nine in Rotterdam.

In May 2019, de Zwaan won his second PDC ranking title by beating Stephen Bunting 8–2.

De Zwaan reached the fourth round of the 2020 World Championship, where he played Peter Wright. Wright led 3–0 in sets and 2–0 in legs before de Zwaan mounted a comeback to level at 3–3 and lead by a break of throw in the deciding set, but Wright eventually won and went on to win the tournament. This was followed by another selection for one of the Premier League nights in Rotterdam, this time under the tag of 'Challenger'.

World Championship results

PDC
 2016: First round (lost to Michael Smith 2–3)
 2019: Second round (lost to Rob Cross 1–3)
 2020: Fourth round (lost to Peter Wright 3–4)
 2021: Second round (lost to Ryan Searle 0–3)

Performance timeline

BDO

PDC

PDC European Tour

References

External links

1996 births
Living people
Dutch darts players
Professional Darts Corporation current tour card holders
People from Rijswijk
PDC ranking title winners
Sportspeople from South Holland